Parliamentary elections were held in Senegal on 22 March 1959. The result was a victory for the Senegalese Progressive Union. Voter turnout was 74.5%.

Results

References

Senegal
1959 in Senegal
Elections in Senegal